The X-ring chain is a specialized type of sealed roller chain used to transfer mechanical power. Like the standard O-ring chains it is also used in high performance motorcycles. It uses X-ring seal to keep lubricant (usually grease) in place.

It has higher performance (in terms of durability, lifetime, and power loss) than non-O-ring chains as it has less friction than O-ring chain while providing adequate lubrication and protection against foreign elements which also increases reliability. It can last twice as long as the O-ring chain under some circumstances.

Development 
The X-ring chain is developed from O-ring chain which in turn is developed from non-O-ring chain. While the regular O-ring chain has high durability, it also has more friction (compared to other types of roller chains) due to distortion of the O-ring due to pressure from the inner and outer chain plates. This results in loss of power in the transmission. Therefore, X-ring chain was developed by replacing O-ring seal with X-ring seal which greatly reduced friction and increased durability.

Design 
Like the O-ring chain it has sealing rings which keep the contaminant (dirt) out, and lubricant in between the pins and bushings. This is known as internal lubrication. However, unlike O-ring chain, it has X shaped seal which does not experience increased surface area (which is in contact with the chain plates) when under pressure. Therefore the friction in X-ring chain does not increase much when pressure is applied by the chain plates. Due to their unique shape, they have two additional sealing surfaces to a traditional O-ring.

See also 
 Motorcycle transmission
O-ring chain

References

External links 
 Cleaning a Motorcycle Chain - webBikeWorld

Motorcycle transmissions